"The law of the jungle" (also called jungle law) is an expression that has come to describe a scenario where "anything goes". The Oxford English Dictionary defines the Law of the Jungle as "the code of survival in jungle life, now usually with reference to the superiority of brute force or self-interest in the struggle for survival". 

The phrase was introduced in Rudyard Kipling's 1894 work The Jungle Book, where it described the behaviour of wolves in a pack.

The Jungle Book 
In the 1894 novel The Jungle Book, Rudyard Kipling uses the term to describe an actual set of legal codes used by wolves and other animals in the jungles of India. In Chapter Two of The Second Jungle Book (1895), Rudyard Kipling provides a poem, featuring the Law of the Jungle as known to the wolves, and as taught to their offspring.

In the 2016 Disney adaptation of the novel, the wolves often recite a poem referred as the "law of the jungle" and when Baloo asks Mowgli if he ever heard a song and he begins to recite this anthem, the bear responds by telling him that it is not a song, but a propaganda text.

See also

Anarchism
Evolutionary psychology
Natural law
Stateless society
Social Darwinism
Survival of the fittest
The Wild West
Callicles
Might makes right

References

External links

Jungle
The Jungle Book